George T. Odom (August 21, 1950 – c. September 21, 2016) was an American character actor, known for roles in film and television. Odom received an Independent Spirit Awards nomination for Best Supporting Male for his portrayal of Ray Brown in the 1991 independent film, Straight Out of Brooklyn.

Biography
Odom was born in The Bronx, New York City, on August 21, 1950, to parents, Mary Ruth (née Brown) and Furman Odom. He was one of four siblings.

In 1991, Odom made his film debut in Straight Out of Brooklyn, portraying Ray Brown, the troubled father of Dennis, played by Lawrence Gilliard Jr.  Odom received a nomination for Independent Spirit Award for Best Supporting Male for his performance, but lost to David Strathairn at the 1992 ceremony. Odom's and Strathairn's fellow nominees in that category were William H. Macy, John Malkovich and Glenn Plummer.

Odom's additional films included Malcolm X in 1992 and The Hurricane in 1999 film. His television credits included guest appearances on New York Undercover, The Sopranos, Third Watch and Law & Order: Special Victims Unit. Odom appeared on eight episodes of Law & Order between 1991 and 2008.

George T. Odom died on September 17, 2016, in Kannapolis, North Carolina, at the age of 66. He was survived by his children, Lisa Odom and David Odom; his grandson; and his sister, Doris Odom; and predeceased by his two brothers, James Odom and Furman Odom, Jr. His funeral was held at the Greater Providence Baptist Church in Charlotte.

Filmography

Music Video
Prince (musician)  "Money Don't Matter 2 Night"

References

External links

1950 births
2016 deaths
American male film actors
American male stage actors
American male television actors
African-American male actors
People from the Bronx
Male actors from New York City
20th-century African-American people
21st-century African-American people